Franklin Jones may refer to:
Franklin D. Jones (1879–1967), mechanical engineering author
Adi Da (Franklin Albert Jones, 1939–2008), founder of Adidam

See also
Frank Jones (disambiguation)